Alan Lorenzo (born 27 July 1998) is an Argentine professional footballer who plays as a defender for Nueva Chicago.

Career
Lorenzo began his career in Nueva Chicago's system. His first appearance in senior football came in July 2017 during a Primera B Nacional loss to San Martín, he had previously been an unused substitute that month for a fixture with Argentinos Juniors on 12 July. Lorenzo was substituted on against San Martín, with his first start arriving on 18 March 2018 as Instituto defeated Nueva Chicago 1–0.

Career statistics
.

References

External links

1998 births
Living people
Footballers from Buenos Aires
Argentine footballers
Association football defenders
Primera Nacional players
Nueva Chicago footballers